Haskins is an unincorporated community in Washington County, Iowa, United States.

Notes

Unincorporated communities in Washington County, Iowa
Unincorporated communities in Iowa